Alexander Guruli (born 9 November 1985) is a professional Georgian football midfielder who plays for US Saint-Omer.

Personal life
He is the son of Gija Guruli.

Career statistics

International

Statistics accurate as of match played 14 November 2012

International goals

References

External links
 
 
 

1985 births
Living people
Sportspeople from Batumi
Footballers from Georgia (country)
Association football midfielders
Georgia (country) under-21 international footballers
Georgia (country) international footballers
Expatriate footballers from Georgia (country)
Expatriate footballers in France
Expatriate footballers in Ukraine
Expatriate footballers in Belarus
Expatriate footballers in Azerbaijan
Expatriate sportspeople from Georgia (country) in Ukraine
Expatriate sportspeople from Georgia (country) in Azerbaijan
Ukrainian Premier League players
Azerbaijan Premier League players
Olympique Lyonnais players
US Boulogne players
Lyon La Duchère players
US Lesquin players
FC Karpaty Lviv players
FC Dila Gori players
FC Dinamo Batumi players
FC Zestafoni players
FC Shakhtyor Soligorsk players
FC Samtredia players
AZAL PFK players
FC Shukura Kobuleti players
Olympique Grande-Synthe players
US Saint-Omer players